Moving in Secret is the debut Korean studio album by South Korean girl group Secret. It was released on October 18, 2011 by TS Entertainment. The title track, "Love is Move", was released on October 17, 2011. It marked the group’s first release in a year since their 2010 EP, Madonna.

Background and release
On August 28, 2011, TS Entertainment revealed that Secret would release their first full-length album in Korea before returning with "Shy Boy" in Japan in November 2011. On September 9, TS Entertainment confirmed that Secret would make a comeback with their first full-length Korean album sometime in October, joining Girls Generation, Kara, T-ara, Brown Eyed Girls, IU and Wonder Girls with the same promotion cycle in late 2011. On October 11, TS Entertainment revealed that the title of their first full-length album was to be Moving in Secret and their new song would show Secret's confident and sexy side. The same day, the official album cover and track listing were unveiled, and their agency revealed that the producers for their comeback song, titled "Love is Move", were Kang Ji Won and Kim Ki Bum, the same producers of their previous hits such as "Magic", "Madonna", "Shy Boy" and "Starlight Moonlight". They added that "Love is Move" is a pop dance song that has "enhanced Secret's colors" and will have an "addictive chorus plus strong beats". The official music video for "Love is Move" was released on October 17, 2011, with the album release the next day.

Singles

"Love is Move" is an uptempo song, composed in a contemporary pop style. Its lyrics tells of a falling relationship in a woman's perspective on how the protagonists incessantly warns her lover that she shouldn't be taken for granted because her feelings towards him might change instantly. The song incorporates various instruments, including horns, electric guitar, bass effect, synthesizers and heavy drum instrumentation. The song layers background vocals throughout the chorus and sections of the bridge. "Love is Move" is a retro-inspired song that draws its influences from the 1930s swing music. Kang Ji Won and Kim Ki Bum both produced, wrote the song's lyrics and melody, while Kang Ji Won arranged the track. According to Catherine Deen from Yahoo! Philippines, "Love is Move" promises to be an updated pop-rock dance-floor romp for Secret unlike [their] previous hits [such as] "Madonna" and "Magic".

The concept of the music video for "Love is Move" was inspired by 1930s cartoon character Betty Boop. TS Entertainment said in a press release, "The Betty Boop character is still an icon to many women because of her ability to speak her mind while still maintaining her feminine charisma. The idea behind Betty Boop seemed to match the haughty and confident image that Secret is trying to express for this concept."

Promotions

Love is Move was performed on various live television music shows. Secret had their comeback performance on Mnet's M! Countdown on October 20, 2011, performing Don't Laugh in addition to Love is Move. The group performed Love is Move on various music shows such as Music Bank, Music Core, MTV's The Show and Inkigayo throughout October and November 2011. Secret also performed the song on many Hallyu Dream Concerts and on various international television appearances. Secret performed Love is Move on B.A.P's debut showcase held in Seoul, South Korea in January 2012. The group also performed the song on MBC's 2012 Music Festival.

Chart performance 
In South Korea, Love is Move entered the Gaon Single Charts at number 3 during the week of October 23, 2011. The song debuted on Billboard's K-Pop Hot 100 chart at number 39. The following week it jumped 36 places and peaked at number 3 on the K-Pop Hot 100 chart.

Track listing

Credits and personnel 
These credits were adapted from the Moving in Secret liner notes.

Kim Tae-sung – executive producer co-producing
Song Jieun - vocals
Han Sunhwa - vocals
Jun Hyoseong - vocals
Jung Hana - vocals, rap, songwriting
Kang Jiwon - co-producing, songwriting, arranger, music
Kim Kibum - co-producing, songwriting,  music

Charts

Album chart

Sales

Release history

References

External links
 

2011 albums
Korean-language albums
Secret (South Korean band) albums
Kakao M albums
TS Entertainment albums